Dixi was originally released on the CBBC website in 2014, then later turned into televised episodes lasting 10–15 minutes each. So far it has had 4 series as being originally confirmed to have a fourth series in late 2016. The latest series aired on the CBBC Website in late 2017.

Series 1 (Online Episodes)

Dixi 1 launched on the CBBC website on 24 February 2014.

Series 2 (Online Episodes)

On September 29, 2014, Dixi 2 was announced. Like series 1, it consists of 30 episodes.

References

Lists of British children's television series episodes